Veronica Hamel (born November 20, 1943) is an American actress and model.  She was nominated five times for an Emmy Award for her role as attorney Joyce Davenport in the TV police drama Hill Street Blues.

Biography
The daughter of a Philadelphia carpenter and a housewife, Hamel graduated from Temple University. She worked as a secretary for a company that manufactured ironing board covers. She began a fashion modeling career after being discovered by Eileen Ford. In her first film role, she played a model in 1971's Klute, followed by roles in the disaster films Beyond the Poseidon Adventure and When Time Ran Out.

She was the model in the last cigarette commercial televised in the U.S. (for Virginia Slims, aired at 11:59 pm on January 1, 1971, on The Tonight Show). Hamel had been a model in print advertisements, not just for Slims, but also for Pall Mall Gold cigarettes.

Hamel started appearing in TV series in 1975. She was considered for the role of Kelly Garrett on Charlie's Angels, but reportedly declined the role. Producer Aaron Spelling cast Jaclyn Smith, instead. She is best remembered for playing Joyce Davenport, the dedicated public defender, who also happened to be the love interest of police captain Frank Furillo, on the long-running TV series Hill Street Blues from 1981-87. She was a five-time Emmy nominee for that role.

Alan Alda's 1988 film A New Life cast Hamel in a leading role as his doctor and love interest. She was cast as Elizabeth, the wife of Charles Grodin's character in the movie Taking Care of Business in 1990. She was named on Us magazine's "Best Dressed" list for 1983.

In 2002, she also appeared on Hill Street Blues creator Steven Bochco's legal drama Philly. In the late 2000s, Hamel had a recurring role in the NBC television series Third Watch and appeared as Margo Shephard, Jack's mother, in the ABC series Lost.

Filmography

Film

Television

References

External links

1943 births
Living people
21st-century American women
American television actresses
Actresses from Philadelphia
Temple University alumni